Carlos Germán Macchi Vacelaire (born October 18, 1974 in Montevideo) is a Uruguayan footballer who plays as a defensive midfielder for Canadian Soccer Club.

References

External links
 
 
 

1974 births
Footballers from Montevideo
Living people
Uruguayan footballers
Uruguayan Primera División players
Uruguay youth international footballers
Association football midfielders
Peñarol players
Liverpool F.C. (Montevideo) players
Caracas FC players
Rampla Juniors players
C.A. Rentistas players
Real C.D. España players
Juventud de Las Piedras players
Miramar Misiones players
Uruguayan expatriate footballers
Expatriate footballers in Venezuela
Expatriate footballers in Honduras
Expatriate footballers in Costa Rica
Liga Nacional de Fútbol Profesional de Honduras players
Uruguayan people of Italian descent